Rumor Has It is the  sixteenth album by American country music artist Reba McEntire. It was released on September 4, 1990. The album continued her streak of late 1980s success and features one of her signature songs, "Fancy", of which CMT ranked at No. 27 on its list of the 100 Greatest Country Songs in 2003.  Additionally, they ranked the video at No. 35 on their list of 100 Greatest Country Videos.  Initially, "Fancy" song wasn't one of McEntire's larger radio hits, despite its acclaim.  It peaked outside of the Top 5 at No. 8. The album peaked at No. 2 on the Billboard country album chart and No. 39 on the Billboard 200, becoming her first album to enter the mainstream top 40. It was certified triple platinum by the RIAA. Rumor Has It was McEntire's first collaboration with record producer Tony Brown.

The album also contained a TV theme song - though not the last TV theme song McEntire would record.  The track "Climb That Mountain High" was featured in the opening credits of an early 1990s ABC sitcom called Delta starring Delta Burke, who played an aspiring country singer. Reba also made a guest appearance on the short-lived sitcom.

Both "You Lie" and "Waitin' For the Deal to Go Down" were previously recorded by country singer Cee Cee Chapman on her 1988 album Twist of Fate, and the latter was covered in 1992 by the short-lived country music band Dixiana on their self-titled album. Their version was released as a single that year, peaking at #39 on the country charts.

The album debuted at #17 on the Billboard Top Country Albums for the week of September 29, 1990, and jumped to number 3 the next week then peaked at #2 the next week. The album stayed in the Top 10 for 26 weeks.

A 30th Anniversary Edition of the album was released on September 11, 2020, and includes two bonus tracks: a new remix of "Fancy" by Dave Audé and a live version of "Fancy" recorded at the Ryman Auditorium in 2020.

Track listing

Personnel
 Reba McEntire – lead and backing vocals
 John Barlow Jarvis – keyboards
 Matt Rollings – keyboards
 Kirk Cappello – synthesizers
 Steve Gibson – acoustic guitar, electric guitar, slide guitar, mandolin
 Dann Huff – electric guitar
 Steve Fishell – steel guitar
 Michael Rhodes – bass guitar
 Edgar Meyer – Arco bass
 Larrie Londin – drums
 Bob Bailey – backing vocals
 Kim Fleming – backing vocals
 Vince Gill – backing vocals
 Vicki Hampton – backing vocals
 Yvonne Hodges – backing vocals
 Pamela Quillon – backing vocals
 Harry Stinson – backing vocals
 Paula Kaye Wallace – backing vocals
 Suzy Wills – backing vocals

Production
 Tony Brown – producer
 Reba McEntire – producer 
 John Guess – recording, mixing, mastering
 Marty Williams – second engineer 
 Milan Bogdan – digital editing
 Glenn Meadows – mastering
 Jessie Noble – project coordinator 
 Mickey Braithwaite – art direction, design 
 Jim McGuire – photography 
 Paul Elledge – back cover photography

Charts

Weekly charts

Year-end charts

Singles

Certifications and sales

References

1990 albums
Reba McEntire albums
MCA Records albums
Albums produced by Tony Brown (record producer)